Paleoamerind or Paleo-Amerind may refer to:
the Siberian ancestors of the Amerinds, see Ancestral Native American
a proposed early population reaching America, not derived from Siberia, see Pleistocene peopling of the Americas

See also
Genetic history of indigenous peoples of the Americas#Paleoamericans
Fuegians#Alternative origin speculations
Paleo-Indian
Amerind (disambiguation)